Granada Breeze was a lifestyle channel operated by Granada Sky Broadcasting, a joint venture between Granada Television and British Sky Broadcasting. The channel was launched as Granada Good Life on 1 October 1996.

Programming
It was aimed at female viewers and showed programmes on lifestyle, cookery, health as well as U.S. daytime television shows such as Judge Joe Brown. The channel was rebranded as Granada Breeze on 1 May 1998. It is usually remembered for paranormal shows such as Psychic Livetime and Predictions With Derek Acorah; these programmes have not been shown on TV since Breeze's closure. In 1999, This Morning'''s resident chef Susan Brookes hosted Susan Brookes' Family Recipes on Granada Breeze with her daughter Gilly, in which they solved cooking problems for families.

The channel was initially split into four three-hour segments: Good Life Food & Wine (Cooking), Good Life Health & Beauty (Health), Good Life TV High Street  (Shopping) and Good Life Home & Garden (Home). These were abolished at the time of rebranding to Granada Breeze.

On ITV Digital the channel shared time with Men & Motors, but when Breeze closed, a testcard was shown in its slot and was not replaced. Its closure was put down to cost, capacity and poor ratings.

The decision to buy programmes rather than make them lost them most of their regular viewers. The channel failed to capitalise on the increasing popularity of its paranormal shows and stopped making them along with all their other shows in 2001. Two Granada Breeze regulars, Yvette Fielding and Derek Acorah, went on to feature in the popular paranormal TV show Most Haunted'' on Living TV.

Closure
On 31 January 2002, Breeze closed down on Sky Digital and ITV Digital. It then left Telewest in mid-March 2002 and it finally shut down on 30 April 2002 on NTL. This allowed Men & Motors to extend broadcasting hours.

References

External links
Granada Good Life at TVARK

Defunct television channels in the United Kingdom
Television channels and stations established in 1996
1996 establishments in the United Kingdom
Television channels and stations disestablished in 2002
2002 disestablishments in the United Kingdom
Granada Breeze